"No Mercy" is a song and single written by Hugh Cornwell, Dave Greenfield, Jet Black and Jean-Jacques Burnel performed by the Stranglers and released in November 1984.

The single made number 37 in the UK Singles Charts in 1984 staying in the charts for eight weeks.  The song was performed as part of their set-list in 1985.

Song and release
The song features on the band's 1984 album Aural Sculpture. One review of the album describes "No Mercy" as “a strong song, with often repeated simple guitar line”. It also notes it as The Stranglers first ever use of backing singers.

The song was released on 1 December 1984 in 7-inch and 12-inch vinyl single formats as well as an ear sculpture shaped picture disc.

Video
The video was shot at St Olave's Hospital in Rotherhithe, London in November 1984. It features the band dressed as doctors and patients. One version of the ending showed a dummy of Hugh Cornwell's body filled with tomato sauce hitting the floor in a bloody heap. Considered too gruesome, the video was never shown with this ending.

Legacy
“No Mercy” is also the title of an authorised biography of The Stranglers, written by David Buckley and issued in 1998.

References 

1984 songs
1984 singles
The Stranglers songs
Songs written by Hugh Cornwell
Songs written by Dave Greenfield
Songs written by Jet Black
Songs written by Jean-Jacques Burnel
Epic Records singles